Eat Bulaga!, formerly Eat... Bulaga!, is a noontime Philippine television variety show broadcast by GMA Network. Produced by TAPE Inc., it is the longest running variety show in the Philippines with over 13,000 episodes. Originally hosted by Tito Sotto, Vic Sotto, Joey de Leon, Chiqui Hollman and Richie D'Horsie, it premiered on July 30, 1979. Tito Sotto, Vic Sotto, de Leon, Jose Manalo, Allan K., Wally Bayola, Paolo Ballesteros, Pauleen Luna, Ryan Agoncillo, Ryzza Mae Dizon, Alden Richards, Maine Mendoza, Maja Salvador, Miles Ocampo, Ruru Madrid, Bianca Umali, Carren Eistrup and Kenji San Pablo currently serve as the hosts.

Overview

Radio Philippines Network (1979–1989)

Production Specialists, Inc., a company owned by Romy Jalosjos, came up with an idea of creating a noontime show for Radio Philippines Network. Antonio Tuviera pitched that Tito Sotto, Vic Sotto and Joey de Leon would be the "perfect" hosts for the show. At a meeting at the InterContinental Manila, Tuviera made an offer to them which was accepted.

Eat Bulaga! premiered on July 30, 1979, with its pilot episode filmed in RPN Live Studio 1 in Broadcast City. Chiqui Hollman and Richie D'Horsie also served as the original hosts. The theme song was written by Vincent Dy Buncio and Pancho Oppus, while melody was composed by Vic Sotto and musically arranged by Homer Flores. During the show's first few months, it was in the brink of cancellation due to competition and lacked of advertisers, despite having their advertising rates reduced to ₱750 and the hosts' lack of salary for six months.

De Leon said that he, Tito and Vic didn't sign a contract with the show, when they were offered to become hosts. Vic Sotto said that he accepted the offer and would stop, once he had money to buy a personal vehicle. De Leon also said that the show was supposed to be a short-term employment. After 2 years, Tito Sotto, Vic Sotto and de Leon decided to stay with the show. The show gained top-rating status in 1980 with the segment "Mr. Macho." Production Specialists later handed production to TAPE, Inc. In 1982, Coney Reyes joined the show as the newest host.

During the People Power Revolution, the show went off the air from February 27, 1986, to March 1, 1986, as the transmitter of RPN had been shut down. In 1987, Aiza Seguerra joined the show after Little Miss Philippines. The show left Broadcast City on December 2, 1987, and transferred to Celebrity Sports Plaza on December 3, 1987. The network was also beset by periodical change of management, leading to Tony Tuviera's decision to conduct negotiations with then-fledgling network ABS-CBN to eventually transfer the show.

ABS-CBN (1989–1995)
In 1989, Eat...Bulaga! moved to ABS-CBN under a co-production agreement due to problems brought about by the sequestration of RPN. On February 18, 1989, the show premiered on ABS-CBN and was staged at Araneta Coliseum, with a TV special titled Eat... Bulaga!: Moving On. After its transfer to ABS-CBN, the show started airing from ABS-CBN Studio 1 at the ABS-CBN Broadcasting Center. During the show's special occasions, they were allowed usage of the network's Studio 2 as a venue. The show's tenth anniversary was held on September 23, 1989, at Araneta Coliseum. In 1991, Ruby Rodriguez and Rio Diaz became regular co-hosts. In 1994, ABS-CBN attempted to buy the airing rights of the show from TAPE Inc. Antonio Tuviera and Malou Choa-Fagar rejected the offer, leading to the network giving an ultimatum to the show to leave the network in January 1995.

GMA Network (since 1995) 
In 1994, the show moved out from ABS-CBN Studio 1, and returned to Celebrity Sports Plaza, as preparation for the show's transfer to GMA Network. A contract signing between TAPE, Inc. and GMA officials was held at the Makati Shangri-La, Manila on January 19, 1995. The show premiered on GMA Network on January 28, 1995, with a TV special titled Eat... Bulaga!: The Moving!.

Toni Rose Gayda, Allan K., Samantha Lopez, and Francis Magalona became hosts in 1995, and Anjo Yllana in 1998. In 2000, Eat Bulaga! became the first to give away millions on Philippine television. The show introduced "Laban o Bawi" to its audience and it became an instant hit. In May 2001, Magalona was removed from the show following his arrest due to drug possession. Janno Gibbs served as his replacement. After his acquittal from the drug charges and subsequent rehabilitation, Magalona returned in 2002. In April 2002, the ratings of Eat Bulaga! surged following the popularity of the SexBomb Dancers and the segment Sige, Ano Kaya Mo? Sakmo!. The 25th year celebration of the show was aired on November 19, 2004, from Expo Pilipino. It won the Best Entertainment (One-Off/Annual) Special at the Asian Television Award in Singapore on December 1, 2005. The presentation, titled Eat Bulaga Silver Special, was broadcast on November 27 and 29, 2004.

In 2006, the SexBomb Girls left the show due to a dispute with the show's producers. They were replaced by EB Babes in August. In March 2007, the SexBomb Girls returned to the show and would later leave in 2011. In September 2007, de Leon started an on-screen fight with Willie Revillame, which led to the Hello Pappy scandal.

On March 6, 2009, Francis Magalona died due to leukemia, and a tribute episode was held the following day. Ryan Agoncillo joined the show later in 2009 and the show's 30th anniversary special Tatlong Dekads ng Dabarkads aired.

In 2014, Lenten drama specials returned and an annual awards ceremony, the Dabarkads Awards, was first held.

In July 2015, the love team AlDub started along with the segment Kalyeserye. The show tripled its Mega Manila and nationwide television ratings and became a daily trending topic on Twitter worldwide. The show held 10 out of 10 highest-rated episodes in 2015. The show held a benefit concert at the Philippine Arena on October 24, 2015. Dubbed as Tamang Panahon, its hashtag #ALDubEBTamangPanahon reached 41 million tweets, becoming the most used hashtag within 24 hours on Twitter. The segment Kalyeserye concluded on December 17, 2016, with a total of 400 episodes.

On December 8, 2018, the show moved its live studio location to APT Studios in Cainta, Rizal. In March 2020, the admission of a live audience in the studio and production were suspended due to the enhanced community quarantine in Luzon caused by the COVID-19 pandemic. The show resumed its programming on June 8, 2020. In 2020, Anjo Yllana and Ruby Rodriguez were let go from the show. On October 2, 2021, Maja Salvador joined the show to host the new segment DC 2021. In June 2022, a reality talent competition segment Bida Next was announced. Carren Eistrup became the segment's grand winner, becoming the show's newest host. In March 2023, Louie Ignacio joined the show as a director.

Cast

 Tito Sotto 
 Vic Sotto 
 Joey de Leon 
 Jose Manalo 
 Allan K. 
 Wally Bayola 
 Paolo Ballesteros 
 Pauleen Luna 
 Ryan Agoncillo 
 Ryzza Mae Dizon 
 Alden Richards 
 Maine Mendoza 
 Maja Salvador 
 Miles Ocampo 
 Ruru Madrid 
 Bianca Umali 
 Carren Eistrup 
 Kenji San Pablo

Former cast
 Adolf Garalde 
 Aicelle Santos 
 Aiko Melendez 
 Ai-Ai delas Alas 
 Aileen Damiles 
 Aiza Seguerra 
 Aji Estornino 
 Alfie Lorenzo
 Ali Sotto 
 Alicia Mayer 
 Amboy Valdez 
 Amy Perez 
 Ana Marie Craig 
 Angela Luz 
 Anjo Yllana 
 Ariana Barouk 
 Ariani Nogueira 
 Atong Redillas 
 BJ Forbes 
 Bababoom Girls 
 Babyface 
 BakClash Divas 
 Baste Granfon 
 Bea Bueno 
 Becca Godinez 
 Bessie Badilla 
 Ronaldo Joseph Joaquin as Bikoy Baboy 
 Bonitos 
 Boom Boom Pow Boys 
 Boy Katawan 
 Broadway Boys 
 Camille Ocampo 
 Carmina Villaroel 
 Ces Quesada 
 Charo Santos-Concio 
 Chia Hollman 
 Chiqui Hollman 
 Chihuahua Boys 
 Christelle Abello 
 Christine Jacob 
 Ciara Sotto 
 Cindy Kurleto 
 Coney Reyes 
 Cumbacheros 
 Daiana Menezes 
 Danilo Barrios 
 Dasuri Choi (최다슬) 
 Dawn Zulueta
 Debraliz Valasote 
 Derek Ramsay 
 Dencio Padilla 
 Diana Zubiri 
 Dindin Llarena 
 Dingdong Avanzado 
 Dingdong Dantis the Impersonator 
 Donita Rose 
Donna Cruz 
E-Male Dancers 
EB Babes 
Echo Calingal 
Edgar Allan Guzman 
Eileen Macapagal 
Eisen Bayubay 
Eric Quizon 
Felipe Tauro  
Francis Magalona 
Fire (Ana Rivera & Soraya Sinsuat) 
Frida Fonda 
Gabby Abshire 
Gemma Fitzgerald 
Gladys Guevarra 
Gov Lloyd 
Gretchen Barretto 
Halina Perez 
Helen Gamboa 
Helen Vela 
Herbert Bautista 
Ho and Ha 
Illac Diaz 
Inday Garutay 
Isabelle Daza 
Iza Calzado 
Jaime Garchitorena 
Janice de Belen 
Janna Tee 
Janno Gibbs 
Jaya 
Jenny Syquia 
Jericho Rosales 
Jimmy Santos 
Joey Albert
John Edric Ulang 
Jomari Yllana 
John Prats
Joyce Jimenez 
Joyce Pring 
Juannie 
Jude Matthew Servilla 
Julia Clarete 
Julia Gonowon 
K Brosas 
Keempee de Leon 
Kevin 
Kidz @ Work 
 Kim Idol 
 Kitty Girls 
 Kris Aquino 
 Kristine Florendo 
 Kurimaw Boyz 
 Lady Lee 
 Lalaine Edson 
 Lana Asanin 
Lana Jalosjos 
Lance Serrano 
Lani Mercado 
Larry Silva 
Leila Kuzma 
Leonard Obal 
Lindsay Custodio 
"Long Tall" Howard Medina 
Los Viajeros 
Lougee Basabas 
Luane Dy 
Lyn Ching-Pascual 
Macho Men Dancers 
Macho Men 
Jinky "Madam Kilay" Cubillan 
Male AttraXion 
Manny Distor 
Maneouvres 
Manilyn Reynes 
Marian Rivera 
Maricel Soriano 
Mark Ariel Fresco 
Maureen Wroblewitz 
Mausi Wohlfarth 
Michael V. 
Michelle van Eimeren 
Mickey Ferriols 
Mike Zerrudo 
Mikee Cojuangco-Jaworski 
Millet Advincula 
Mitoy Yonting 
Music Hero Band 
Nadine Schmidt 
Niño Muhlach 
Nova Villa 
OctoArts Dancers 
Ogie Alcasid 
Onemig Bondoc 
Patani Daño 
Patricia Fernandez 
Patricia Tumulak 
Pepe Pimentel 
Phoemela Baranda 
Pia Guanio 
Plinky Recto 
Pops Fernandez 
Priscilla Monteyro 
The Quandos 
Rachel Ann Wolfe
 Rading Carlos 
 Randy Santiago 
 Rannie Raymundo 
 Raqi Terra 
 Rey de la Cruz 
 Rey Pumaloy 
 Richard Hwan 
 Richard Merk
 Richie D'Horsie 
 Rio Diaz 
 Robert Em 
 Robert Ortega
 Robin da Roza 
 Rosanna Roces 
 Roxanne Abad Santos 
 Ruby Rodriguez 
 Ruffa Gutierrez 
 Ryan Julio 
 Sam Y.G. 
 Samantha "Gracia" Lopez 
 Sandy Daza 
 Santa Mesa Boys 
 Sarah Lahbati 
 SexBomb Girls 
 Sharmaine Suarez 
 Sharon Cuneta 
 Sherilyn Reyes 
 Sheryl Cruz 
 Shine Kuk(국선영)
 Sinon Loresca 
 Sixbomb Dancers 
 Solenn Heussaff 
 Stefanie Walmsley
 Steven Claude Goyong 
 Streetboys 
 Sugar Mercado 
 Sunshine Cruz 
 Taki Saito 
 Tania Paulsen 
 Tanya Garcia 
 Teri Onor 
 Tessie Tomas 
 Tetchie Agbayani 
 That's My Bae 
 Toni Gonzaga 
 Toni Rose Gayda 
 Tuck-In Boys 
 Twinky 
 Universal Motion Dancers 
 Val Sotto 
 Valentin Simon 
 Valerie Weigmann 
 Vanessa Matsunaga 
 Vanna Vanna 
 Vicor Dancers 
 Victor "Tenten" Mendoza 
 Vina Morales
 WEA Dancers 
 Yoyong Martirez 
 Zoren Legaspi

Ratings
According to AGB Nielsen Philippines' Mega Manila household television ratings, the show had its highest rating on October 24, 2015, with a 50.8% rating during the Tamang Panahon special.

Spin-offs
The regional version of the show, Eat Na Ta! premiered on November 12, 2007. While Eat Na Ta sa TV started on November 24, 2007.

Internationally, Eat Bulaga! Indonesia premiered on July 16, 2012, and later The New Eat Bulaga! Indonesia at ANTV on November 17, 2014. In 2019, Eat Bulaga! Myanmar started development.

See also
 List of accolades received by Eat Bulaga!

References

External links
 
 

 
1979 Philippine television series debuts
ABS-CBN original programming
Filipino-language television shows
GMA Network original programming
Philippine variety television shows
Radio Philippines Network original programming
Television productions suspended due to the COVID-19 pandemic
Television series by TAPE Inc.